Alexander is a 2008 Russian historical action film about Alexander Nevsky directed by Igor Kalyonov.

Plot
The film starts with Nevsky's wedding which involves an attempt of poisoning by his former friend Ratmir. Yashka, a jester at the wedding tried to warn him but was dragged away and was put under a table by the Nevsky's guards. Desperate to serve his leader as a savior, not only as a fool, Yashka comes out of the table and drinks from Nevsky's cup in which suspected poison was placed. After the attempt, Ratmir escapes the ceremony and gallops away on a horse. After the ceremony, Alexander orders to find him, because he suspects that Ratmir was plotting it from the orders of the Swedes who were approaching Novgorod at that time. Meantime, the Boyars and Mongols are besieging the city as well. Alexander then goes underground where he finds Boyars and kill their leader.

Cast
Anton Pampushnyy as Alexander Nevsky
Svetlana Bakulina  as Alexandra Nevskaya
Igor Botvin as Ratmir
Bohdan Stupka as Yaroslav
Dmitriy Bykovskiy-Romashov as Birger Jarl
Andrey Fedortsov as Kornily
Yuliya Galkina as Daria
Valeriy Kukhareshin as Eric XI
Sergey Lysov as Misha
Aleksandr Orlovskiy
Valentin Zakharov as Savva
Semyon Mendelson as Yakov
Denis Shvedov as Sbyslav Yakunovich 
Pavel Trubiner as Dmitry
Artur Vaha as head of Boyars
Artyom Leschik as Ulf Fasi
Yuriy Tarasov as jester of Eric XI
Evgeniy Kapitonov as Roman Kulik
Roman Litvinov as Alexey Batkov

Reception
Alexander received negative reviews in the West in general, but the Russian site RusKino said that such films are important for Russia and its people since the Russian youth don't get much education about history from its teachers.

References

External links

Review of Alexander on KinoAfisha

2008 films
2000s historical action films
Films set in Russia
Russian historical action films
Biographical action films
2000s Russian-language films